Christopher Basstian (1820–1895) was a 19th-century Member of Parliament from Southland, New Zealand.

One newspaper said before the by-election  Mr Basstian's strong squatting proclivities ought certainly to prevent him getting the support of the "bona fide" settlers of the district and those who have any regard for its future prosperity (so preferred Dr Monckton). Another report said that he pronounces in favour of abolition (of the provinces) and is otherwise moderate in politics.

He was defeated in the 1875 general election, held in December.

References

1820 births
1895 deaths
New Zealand MPs for South Island electorates
Members of the New Zealand House of Representatives
19th-century New Zealand politicians